Aspilia africana, also known as the haemorrhage plant or wild sunflower,  is one of about 50 species of the genus Aspilia.

Description
Aspilia africana is a semi-woody herb from a perennial woody root-stock to 25-130cm high. Leaves are 4-12cm long and lanceolate. The fruit are 3-3.5mm long achenes.

It is very polymorphic with at least four varieties recognized.

Distribution and habitat
It is widely distributed across tropical Africa, occurring on grasslands, woodlands, forest margins, and abandoned cultivated zones.

Traditional medicine
Aspilia africana has been classified as a low toxicity plant and has been used in traditional African medicine to treat wounds. Its leaves are taken as an infusion by women after childbirth. There is no scientific evidence that it has any medicinal properties.

References

External links
 Useful Tropical Plants - Aspilia africana

Heliantheae